Lautaro Delgado (Buenos Aires, 1978) is an Argentine film and TV actor. In 2006 he appeared in Crónica de una fuga and in 2010 he appeared in Revolución: El cruce de los Andes.

Filmography 
 1995: Montaña rusa, otra vuelta TV Series .... Franky
 1998: Alas, poder y pasión TV Series .... Cato
 1998: Doña Bárbara .... Lorenzo Barquero Joven
 1999: Verano del '98 (1998) TV Series
 2000: Ilusiones (compartidas) TV Series .... Martín Fattone
 2001: Un Amor en Moisés Ville
 2004: El Topo
 2004: Palermo Hollywood .... Enrique
 2005: Iluminados por el fuego
 2006: La Punta del diablo .... Franco
 2006: Crónica de una fuga (2006)
 2010: Aballay
 2010: Revolución: El cruce de los Andes
 2015: Kryptonita .... Lady Di (based on Wonder Woman)
 2016: I'm Gilda

External links 
 Official Website
 

Year of birth missing (living people)
Argentine male film actors
Argentine male television actors
Living people
Place of birth missing (living people)
20th-century Argentine male actors
21st-century Argentine male actors